The 52nd Academy Awards ceremony, organized by the Academy of Motion Picture Arts and Sciences (AMPAS), honored films released in 1979 and took place on April 14, 1980, at the Dorothy Chandler Pavilion in Los Angeles beginning at 6:00 p.m. PST / 9:00 p.m. EST. During the ceremony, AMPAS presented Academy Awards (commonly referred to as Oscars) in 22 categories. The ceremony, televised in the United States by ABC, was produced by Howard W. Koch and directed by Marty Pasetta. Comedian and talk show host Johnny Carson hosted the show for the second consecutive year. Three days earlier, in a ceremony held at The Beverly Hilton in Beverly Hills, California, on April 11, the Academy Scientific and Technical Awards were presented by hosts Cloris Leachman and William Shatner.

Kramer vs. Kramer won five awards, including Best Picture, Best Director for Robert Benton, Best Actor for Dustin Hoffman, and Best Supporting Actress for Meryl Streep. Sally Field received Best Actress honors for Norma Rae, and Melvyn Douglas won Best Supporting Actor for Being There. The telecast received a mixed reception with critics praising Carson's hosting performance but criticising the pacing and predictability of the ceremony. It garnered 49 million viewers in the United States which was a 6% increase on the previous year.

Winners and nominees
The nominees for the 52nd Academy Awards were announced on February 25, 1980, by Academy president Fay Kanin and actors Ed Asner and Yvette Mimieux. All That Jazz and Kramer vs. Kramer tied for the most nominations with nine each. The winners were announced at the awards ceremony on April 14. At age eight, Best Supporting Actor nominee Justin Henry became the youngest person nominated for an Oscar.

Awards

Winners are listed first, highlighted in boldface and indicated with a double dagger.

Academy Honorary Awards
 Hal Elias  "For his dedication and distinguished service to the Academy of Motion Picture Arts and Sciences."
 Alec Guinness  "For advancing the art of screen acting through a host of memorable and distinguished performances."

Jean Hersholt Humanitarian Award
The award recognizes individuals whose humanitarian efforts have brought credit to the motion picture industry.

 Robert Benjamin

Irving G. Thalberg Memorial Award
The award honors "creative producers whose bodies of work reflect a consistently high quality of motion picture production".

 Ray Stark

Special Achievement Award
 Alan Splet for the sound effects editing in The Black Stallion

Academy Award for Technical Achievement
 Mark Serrurier – "For the progressive development of the Moviola from the 1924 invention of his father, Iwan Serrurier, to the present Series 20 sophisticated film editing equipment."

Multiple nominations and awards

Presenters and performers
The following individuals, listed in order of appearance, presented awards or performed musical numbers.

Presenters

Performers

Ceremony information

In September 1979, the Academy hired film producer Howard W. Koch to produce the telecast for the sixth time. Upon being named producer, Koch responded in a press release stating, "I plan to involve all the professional and creative talents of the motion picture community in this program, as the Academy Awards, in the public's mind, represents the entire field of filmmaking." Two months later, it was announced that comedian and The Tonight Show host Johnny Carson would preside over emceeing duties for the 1980 ceremony. "Johnny Carson is one of our national treasures. He was selected as this year's host because his wit and verve made him an outstanding master of ceremonies at last year's show," said Koch in a statement justifying his selection for host.

Several other people were involved with the production of the ceremony. Marty Pasetta was hired as director of the telecast. Henry Mancini served as musical director and conductor for the ceremony where he conducted an overture performed by the orchestra at the beginning of the show. A song-and-dance number featuring actor and singer Donald O'Connor paid tribute to choreography in film.

Critical reviews
The ceremony received a mixed reception from critics. The Arizona Republic columnist Michael Maza wrote, "Watching last night's 52nd Annual Academy Award ceremonies was like sitting through three hours and 15 minutes of near-flawless close order drill. It wasn't long before the feet seemed to blur." Jack Mathews of the Detroit Free Press commented, "In any event, the 52nd Academy Awards presentation will stand as one of the smoothest, most predictable, most reasonable Oscar nights in history. Also, alas, one of the most boring." The Baltimore Sun television critic Bill Carter quipped, "We found out Monday night when this year's edition of the Oscarcast streamlined to the point of emaciation (and still more than three hours long), thudded along like some awards dinner of the meat-packing industry." He praised Carson's hosting performance, but said, "For all the excitement this parade of stars provided, they might as well have sent in their stand-ins, or maybe some robot, or well dressed mannequins from a boutique on Rodeo Drive. This just wasn't a little boring, this was mind-numbingly boring."

Others received the broadcast more positively. Los Angeles Times film critic Charles Champlin mused, "As a show, the Marty Pasetta-Howard Koch special revealed again a gift for all that pizzazz." He added, "If nobody in fact was dozing, it was thanks to Carson's own relaxed and engaging presence. Among his virtues, he is an emcee who seems to love the movies." Film critic Gene Siskel from the Chicago Tribune commented,  "The show was a visual delight, thanks to special electronic effects that presented scenes from each nominated film as its title was announced." Columnist Patrick Taggart of the Austin American-Statesman wrote, "Aren't we entitled to at least one upset victory among the nominees? The 52nd running of the Academy Awards was distinguished by the utter lack of any such color; but somehow, in spite of its slickness, Monday's show was a relatively good one."

Ratings and reception
The American telecast on ABC drew in an average of 49 million people over the length of the entire ceremony, which was a 6% increase from the previous year's ceremony. However, the show drew lower Nielsen ratings compared to the previous ceremony with 33.7% of households watching with a 55% share. Furthermore, the ceremony presentation received five nominations at the 32nd Primetime Emmys, but failed to win any of its nominations.

See also
 List of submissions to the 52nd Academy Awards for Best Foreign Language Film

References

Bibliography

 

Academy Awards ceremonies
1979 film awards
1980 in American cinema
Academy Awards
April 1980 events in the United States
Academy
Television shows directed by Marty Pasetta